Sten is a Scandinavian male given name. Literally meaning "stone", it derives from a literal translation of Peter into the North Germanic languages.

Notable individuals with the name include
Sten Abel (1872–1942), Norwegian sailor
Sten Andersson (1923–2006), Swedish politician
Sten-Erik Anderson (born 1991), Estonian rower
Sten Bergman (1895–1975), Swedish zoologist 
Sten De Geer (1886–1933), Swedish geographer and geomorphologist
Sten Ekberg (born 1964), Swedish decathlon athlete
Sten Elfström (born 1942), Swedish actor
Sten Esna (born 1982), Estonian volleyball player and coach
Sten Forshufvud (1903–1985), Swedish dentist, physician, and toxicologist
Sten Grillner (born 1941), Swedish neurophysiologist 
Sten Grytebust (born 1989), Norwegian footballer
Sten Heckscher (born 1942), Swedish politician
Sten Lassmann (born 1982), Estonian pianist 
Sten Lindroth (1914–1980), Swedish historian
Sten Ljunggren (born 1938), Swedish actor
Sten Lundin (1931–2016), Swedish motocross racer
Sten Nadolny (born 1942), German novelist
Sten Olmre (born 1995), Estonian basketball player
Sten Pålsson (born 1945), Swedish footballer
Sten Pentus (born 1981), Estonian racing driver
Sten Priinits (born 1987), Estonian fencer
Sten Reinkort (born 1998), Estonian footballer
Sten Rudberg (1917–1996), Swedish geographer and geomorphologist
Sten Sokk (born 1989), Estonian basketball player 
Sten Stensen (born 1947), Norwegian speed skater
Sten Sture the Elder (1440–1503), Regent of Sweden
Sten Sture the Younger (1493–1520), Regent of Sweden under the Kalmar Union
Sten Swedlund (1937–2014), Swedish rear admiral
Sten Wahlund (1901–1976), Swedish geneticist
Sten Wåhlin (1914–1981), Swedish Army lieutenant general

In fiction:

 Sten (Breath of Fire 2 character)
 Sten, a Qunari warrior in BioWare's 2009 RPG Dragon Age: Origins
 Sten, a character in Allan Cole and Chris Bunch's series The Sten Chronicles
 Sten, a character in the anime Akame ga Kill!

Notable individuals with the family name Sten include
 Åge Sten Nilsen, member of Norwegian hard rock band Wig Wam
 Anna Sten, Ukrainian film actress
 Helge Sten, Norwegian musician

Masculine given names
Danish masculine given names
Estonian masculine given names
Norwegian masculine given names
Swedish masculine given names